Los Encinos State Historic Park is a state park unit of California, preserving buildings of Rancho Los Encinos.  The park is located near the corner of Balboa and Ventura Boulevards in Encino, California, in the San Fernando Valley.  The rancho includes the original nine-room de la Ossa Adobe, the two-story limestone Garnier building, a blacksmith shop, a natural spring, and a pond.  The  site was established as a California state park in 1949.

History

The natural spring provided a year-round source of water for the ancient village of Siutcanga, home to the Tongva people, for thousands of years. The name syútkanga actually means "place of the oak" in the Fernandeño language, a dialect of the Tongva language, a name later reflected in Spanish as Los Encinos, or "the oaks" in Spanish. A description of this village was recorded as part of the 1769 Portola Expedition. This Spanish expedition reached the San Fernando Valley and named it "El Valle de Santa Catalina de Bononia de Los Encinos" (The Valley of St. Catherine of Bononia of the Oaks).

Located along a significant travel route between Los Angeles and Santa Barbara, the property passed through many hands between the 1840s and the early 20th century. Today the park contains exhibits related to the agricultural enterprises of Rancho Los Encinos' various owners, including Mission Indian, Mexican Californio, French, and French Basque families.

Proposed for closure
Los Encinos State Historic Park was one of 70 California state parks proposed for closure by July 2012 as part of a deficit reduction program.  It was previously one of many state parks threatened with closure in 2008.  Those closures were ultimately avoided by cutting hours and maintenance system-wide.

California Historical Landmark Marker
California Historical Landmark Marker NO. 689 at the site reads:
NO. 689 LOS ENCINOS STATE HISTORIC PARK - The Franciscan padres used Encino as their headquarters while exploring the valley before establishing Mission San Fernando in 1797. In 1849 Vincente de la Osa built an adobe with nine rooms. The next owner of El Encino Rancho was Eugene Garnier, who built the existing two-story limestone house in 1872. In December 1891 Domingo Amestoy acquired the property.

See also
List of California state parks

References

External links

Los Encinos State Historic Park
Los Encinos Docents Association

1949 establishments in California
Buildings and structures in the San Fernando Valley
California State Historic Parks
Encino, Los Angeles
History of the San Fernando Valley
Museums established in 1949
Museums in Los Angeles
Open-air museums in California
Parks in the San Fernando Valley
California Historical Landmarks